Andreas Lienhart (born 21 August 1986) is an Austrian football coach and a former player who played as a right back. He is an assistant coach with Hartberg.

Career
On 11 June 2019, it was confirmed that Lienhart had joined TSV Hartberg on a 2-year contract.

References

1986 births
Living people
Association football defenders
Austrian footballers
Grazer AK players
Kapfenberger SV players
SC Rheindorf Altach players
TSV Hartberg players
2. Liga (Austria) players
Austrian Football Bundesliga players
Austrian football managers